Eaton High School can refer to:
 Eaton High School (Colorado), Eaton, Colorado
 Eaton High School (Ohio), Eaton, Ohio
 V.R. Eaton High School, Fort Worth, Texas

See also
Eaton School (disambiguation)